Adistemia watsoni is a species of minute brown scavenger beetles native to Europe.

Distribution
This beetle is found in northern Africa, most of Europe, parts of Asia and North America. Its range includes Madeira, the Canary Islands, Morocco, Algeria and Egypt, Western Europe, Israel, Japan and Canada.

References

Latridiidae
Beetles described in 1871
Beetles of Europe